Le Moulin de la Sourdine (1936), translated as The Secret Stream, is a novel by French writer Marcel Aymé.

Plot
In a small provincial French town (based on Dole, where the author grew up), a notary in the grip of his sexual fantasies savagely murders his young maid. A schoolboy happens to witness the crime during an escapade atop a church bell tower, but after the maid's body is discovered, suspicions quickly fall upon a vagrant with a physical deformity.

Publication
Written between the fall of 1935 and the spring of 1936, Le Moulin de la Sourdine first appeared as a serial in Marianne from 29 April to 5 August 1936 before being published by Gallimard. The book was translated into English by Norman Denny for the Bodley Head in 1953 and Harper in 1954.

Reception
Kirkus Reviews wrote that the book "lacks the satiric invention of [Aymé's] later books, but there's cutting edge to this portfolio of life in a small town in the French provinces and the covert conduct of its leading citizens".

References

1936 French novels
French crime novels
Novels by Marcel Aymé
Éditions Gallimard books